Hauteroche Castle is a ruined 14th-century castle, destroyed after a siege in 1554, in the village of Dourbes in the municipality of Viroinval, province of Namur, Wallonia, Belgium.

The castle site was scientifically excavated between 1976 and 2002.

See also
List of castles in Belgium

Sources
 Archeostage.com: reports of archaeological excavations of the castle site

External links
Hauteroche Castle photos and description, www.castles.nl

References
 De Boe G., 1982. Le sanctuaire gallo-romain dans la plaine de Bieure à Matagne-la-Grande. Archaeologia Belgica, Brussels: Service National des Fouilles, p 25
 Plumier J. and Pleuger J.L., 1986: Le château de Hauteroche à Dourbes. Archaeologia Belgica II, Brussels: Service National des Fouilles, 1, p.109-112
 Pleuger J.L. and Pleuger E., 2001. Viroinval/Dourbes : fouille du château de Hauteroche. Chronique de l’Archéologie Wallonne, Namur, 9, p 227-228
 Pleuger J.L. and Pleuger E., 2002: Viroinval/Dourbes : fouille du château de Hauteroche. Chronique de l’Archéologie Wallonne, Namur, 9, p 255-256

Castles in the Ardennes (Belgium)
Castles in Belgium
Castles in Namur (province)